"Ransom" (stylized as "RAN$OM") is a song by American rapper Lil Tecca, initially released independently on May 22, 2019, then later through Galactic Records and Republic Records. It serves as the second single from his debut mixtape We Love You Tecca. The song has since come to be regarded as Lil Tecca's signature song.

The song was produced by Nick Mira and Taz Taylor, and debuted at number 93 on the US Billboard Hot 100 before reaching number 4. Outside the United States, "Ransom" peaked within the top ten of the charts in Australia, Canada, Denmark, Finland, New Zealand, Norway, Portugal, the Republic of Ireland, Sweden and the United Kingdom. It was later followed up by a remix with fellow rapper Juice Wrld in August 2019.

Background
The song was considered the breakthrough of Queens-based rapper Lil Tecca, who began releasing songs through SoundCloud in 2018.

Critical reception
Sheldon Pearce of Pitchfork said Lil Tecca's "bounce in his singsong flows owes a lot to" AutoTune, and his "bittersweet melodies are as indebted to local hero A Boogie wit da Hoodie as they are sourpuss king Juice Wrld". Although finding that the lyrics follow the "traditional rapper playbook practically to the letter, Pearce said "even now he's capable of making the profound seem simple".

Music video
The music video was released on May 22, 2019, and was directed and edited by Cole Bennett. It was shot in the Dominican Republic.

Remix
On August 14, 2019, Lil Tecca released the remix of the song on his SoundCloud with Juice Wrld, who has also worked with Nick Mira on other songs, including "Lucid Dreams". The remix was released on other platforms the following day. The track was mixed by Taz Taylor and Nick Mira. The remix later got added to his debut mixtape We Love You Tecca alongside the original version.

Charts

Original version

Weekly charts

Year-end charts

Remix

Certifications

References

2019 singles
2019 songs
Lil Tecca songs
Music videos directed by Cole Bennett
Republic Records singles
Song recordings produced by Taz Taylor (record producer)
Songs written by Nick Mira
Songs written by Taz Taylor (record producer)
Songs written by Lil Tecca